The Munster Hurling Intermediate Championship is an annual hurling competition organised by the Gaelic Athletic Association since 1961 for the strong hurling teams in the province of Munster in Ireland. In some cases the teams consist of players who are not on the senior squads for their county (thus in effect, they are a second team), or in others of players who are from junior or intermediate clubs. The competition was established to prevent the stronger counties from dominating the Munster Junior Hurling Championship.

The series of games are played during the summer months with the Munster final currently being played in July. The prize for the winning team is the Sweet Afton Cup. The championship has always been played on a straight knockout basis whereby once a team loses they are eliminated from the series.

The Munster Championship is an integral part of the wider All-Ireland Intermediate Hurling Championship. The winners of the Munster final, like their counterparts in Leinster Championship, are rewarded by advancing directly to the latter stages of the All-Ireland series of games.

The title has been won at least once by all six Munster counties, four of which have won the title more than once. The all-time record-holders are Cork, who have won the competition 13 times.

Format
The Munster Championship is a knockout tournament with pairings drawn at random – there are no seeds.

Each match is played as a single leg. If a match is drawn there is extra time and, if the sides still remain level, a second period of extra time is played.

The format has remained the same since the very first Munster Championship in 1961. An open draw is made in which three of the five teams automatically qualify for the semi-final stage of the competition. Two other teams play in a lone quarter-final with the winner joining the other three teams at the semi-final stage. Once a team is defeated they are eliminated from the championship.

The Munster Championship has wider implications for the All-Ireland Intermediate Hurling Championship. The winners of the Munster final automatically qualify for the latter stages of the All-Ireland series of games. Unlike the final runners-up in the minor and senior championships, there is no 'back-door system' at intermediate level.

Five of the six counties of Munster – Clare, Cork, Limerick, Tipperary and Waterford – participate in the championship. Kerry, the sixth county in the province, contested the Munster Championship until recently. Galway took part in the competition in the 1960s.

Trophies
At the end of the Munster final, the winning team is presented with a trophy. The cup, named the Sweet Afton Cup, is held by the winning team until the following year's final. Traditionally, the presentation is made at a special rostrum in the stand where GAA dignitaries and special guests view the match.

The cup is decorated with ribbons in the colours of the winning team. During the game the cup actually has both teams' sets of ribbons attached and the runners-up ribbons are removed before the presentation. The winning captain accepts the cup on behalf of his team before giving a short speech. Individual members of the winning team then have an opportunity to come to the rostrum to lift the cup.

The present trophy was presented by Tipperary man Jerry Shelly in 1961 to commemorate the new competition.

General statistics

Performance by county

Biggest Munster final wins
 The most one sided Munster finals:
 24 points – 1963: Tipperary 6–10 (28) – (4) 0–4 Clare
 21 points – 2009: Cork 5–24 (39) – (18) 3–9 Waterford
 20 points – 1969: Cork 4–14 (26) – (6) 0–6 Galway
 13 points – 2014: Cork 4–15 (27) – (14) 2–8 Tipperary
 12 points – 1964: Cork 4–13 (25) – (13) 1–10 Galway
 12 points – 2007: Waterford 5–12 (27) – (15) 1–12 Limerick

Miscellaneous
 Cork hold the record for the longest streak of success in finals. They won four championships in-a-row between 2003 and 2006.
 Tipperary hold the record for the longest streak of defeated in finals. They lost three championship deciders in-a-row between 2004 and 2006.
 Cork hold the record for the most consecutive appearances in Munster finals. They played in four-in-a-row on two separate occasions, firstly between 1967 and 1970, and most recently between 2003 and 2006.
 Two counties have completed the Munster intermediate and senior double in the same year:
 Cork in 1969, 1999, 2003, 2005, 2006
 Tipperary in 1961, 1971
 Waterford in 2007
 Cork is the only county to have completed the Munster minor, under-21, intermediate and senior 'grand slam' in the same year.  This was achieved in 1969 and again in 2005.
 Only one player has captained his county to Munster titles in both the intermediate and senior grades:
 Pat Mulcahy captained Cork to the intermediate title in 1997 and the senior title in 2006.

List of Munster Finals

See also
 Leinster Intermediate Hurling Championship
 Connacht Intermediate Hurling Championship
 Ulster Intermediate Hurling Championship

References

2008 Final Report
2011 Final report

Sources
 Roll of Honour on www.gaainfo.com

Munster GAA inter-county hurling competitions